The Thomas Hills are a linear group of hills,  long, between Foundation Ice Stream and MacNamara Glacier at the north end of the Patuxent Range in the Pensacola Mountains, Antarctica. They were mapped by the U.S. Geological Survey from surveys and from U.S. Navy  air photos, 1956–66. The hills were named by the Advisory Committee on Antarctic Names at the suggestion of Captain Finn Ronne, U.S. Navy Reserve, leader at Ellsworth Station, 1957. Charles S. Thomas was Secretary of the Navy, 1954–57, during the first few years of U.S. Navy Operation Deep Freeze.

Features
Geographical features include:

 MacNamara Glacier
 Martin Peak
 Nance Ridge

References
 

Hills of Queen Elizabeth Land
Pensacola Mountains